Olga Nelyubova (born 12 July 1964) is a Russian female former track and field athlete who competed in middle-distance running events. Her sole international medal came at the 1988 European Athletics Indoor Championships, where she was the 800 metres silver medallist behind West Germany's Sabine Zwiener.

She was a one-time national champion, winning the 1500 metres at the Russian Championships in 1998. She competed at three editions of the World Championships in Athletics, with her best performance being seventh in the final in 1997.

International competitions

National titles
Russian Athletics Championships
1500 m: 1998

Personal bests
800 metres – 1:59.29 min (1997)
1000 metres – 2:39.23 min (1996)
1500 metres – 4:01.42 min (1998)
Mile run – 4:29.28 min (2002)
3000 metres – 8:47.90 min (2002)

See also
List of European Athletics Indoor Championships medalists (women)

References

External links

Living people
1964 births
Russian female middle-distance runners
Soviet female middle-distance runners
World Athletics Championships athletes for Russia
Russian Athletics Championships winners